Bridal Veil Falls, Bridalveil Falls or Bridalveil Fall is a frequently-used name for waterfalls that observers fancy resemble a bride's veil:

Australia
Bridal Veil Falls, Leura, in the Blue Mountains National Park, New South Wales
Govetts Leap Falls, also called the Bridal Veil Falls, in the Blue Mountains National Park, New South Wales

Canada
Bridal Veil Falls (Banff), Banff National Park, Alberta
Bridal Veil Falls, in Bridal Veil Falls Provincial Park, Fraser Valley, British Columbia
Bridal Veil Falls (Manitoulin Island), Kagawong River, Manitoulin Island, Ontario

France, Reunion (Indian Ocean)
Bridal Veil Falls (Salazie), Salazie
Bridal Veil Falls (Voile de la Mariée), Le Tampon

New Zealand
Bridal Veil Falls (Waikato), Waikato, North Island
Bridal Veil Falls (Rotorua), a geothermal formation in Waiotapu, near Rotorua, North Island
Bridal Veil Falls (Canterbury), Arthur's Pass, South Island
Bridal Veil Falls (Skippers Canyon, Otago), Skippers Canyon, Central Otago, South Island
Bridal Veil Falls (Routeburn, Otago), Routeburn, Queenstown-Lakes District, South Island

Norway
Bridal Veil Falls (Geirangerfjord), Geirangerfjord.

Peru
Catarata Velo de la Novia, Chanchamayo Province

Philippines
Bridal Veil Falls (Iligan City), Iligan City

Portugal
Cascata do Véu da Noiva, Madeira

South Africa
Bridal Veil Falls (Sabie), Mpumalanga

United States
Bridal Veil Falls (Skagway, Alaska), a waterfall in Alaska
Bridal Veil Falls (Valdez-Cordova Census Area, Alaska), in Keystone Canyon, flowing into the Lowe River
Bridal Veil Falls (Arkansas), in Cleburne County outside of Heber Springs
Bridalveil Fall, Yosemite National Park, California
Bridal Veil Falls (Eldorado), Eldorado National Forest, California
Bridal Veil Falls (Colorado Springs), Colorado Springs, Colorado
Bridal Veil Falls (Glenwood Springs), Glenwood Springs, Colorado
Bridal Veil Falls (Idaho Springs), Idaho Springs, Colorado
Bridal Veil Falls (Rocky Mountain National Park), Rocky Mountain National Park, Colorado
Bridal Veil Falls (Telluride), Telluride, Colorado
Bridalveil Falls (Michigan) at Pictured Rocks National Lakeshore, Michigan
Bridal Veil Falls (Minnesota), Minneapolis, Minnesota
Bridal Veil Falls (New Hampshire), Franconia, New Hampshire
Bridal Veil Falls (Catskill Mountains), Catskill Mountains, New York
Bridal Veil Falls (Niagara Falls), New York, one of the Niagara Falls
Bridal Veil Falls (Plattekill Creek), Catskill Mountains, New York
Bridal Veil Falls (DuPont State Forest), DuPont State Forest, North Carolina
Bridal Veil Falls (Macon County), Highlands, North Carolina
Bridal Veil Falls (Ohio), Bedford, Ohio
Bridal Veil Falls (Oregon), Bridal Veil Falls State Park, Oregon
Bridal Veil Falls (Pennsylvania), Bushkill Falls, Pennsylvania
Bridal Veil Falls (South Dakota), Spearfish, South Dakota
Bridal Veil Falls (Tennessee), Monteagle, Tennessee
Bridal Veil Falls (University of the South), University of the South in Sewanee campus
Bridal Veil Falls (Utah), Provo Canyon, Utah County, Utah
Bridal Veil Falls (Washington), Gold Bar, Washington

Zimbabwe 
Bridal Veil Falls (Zimbabwe), Chimanimani, Zimbabwe